Shandong Six Stars (山东南斗六星) is a Chinese professional women's basketball club based in Shandong, playing in the Women's Chinese Basketball Association (WCBA).

In Chinese constellations, the asterism known as the "Six Stars of South Dipper" is located in Sagittarius.

Season-by-season records

Current players

Notable former players

 Coco Miller (2005–06)
 Chante Black (2011–12)
 Ashley Paris (2015–16)
 Lynetta Kizer (2017–18)
 Yang Ya-hui (2017–18)
 Miao Bo (2002–03)

References

Women's Chinese Basketball Association teams
Sport in Shandong